Fargo is a surname. Notable people with the surname include:

Brian Fargo (born 1962), American video game designer, developer, producer and executive
Donna Fargo (born 1945), American country music singer-songwriter
Frank Anthony Fargo (1933–2009), Italian/Canadian chemist, entrepreneur and philanthropist
Greg Fargo (born 1983), Canadian ice hockey coach
Heather Fargo (born 1952), former Mayor and former City Council Member of Sacramento
Henry Bond Fargo (1843–1932), American banker and politician
Irene Fargo (1963–2022),  Italian singer and stage actress 
Jackie Fargo (1930–2013), retired American professional wrestler
J. C. Fargo (1829–1915), James Congdell Fargo, former president of American Express
Susan Fargo (1942–2019), American politician
Thomas B. Fargo (born 1948), United States Naval admiral
William Fargo (1818–1881), pioneer American expressman, namesake of Fargo, North Dakota

Fictional characters:
Chief Judge Fargo, from the Judge Dredd comic strip in 2000 AD
Douglas Fargo, from the TV series Eureka